Florian Prantl was an Austrian luger who competed in the late 1970s and early 1980s. A natural track luger, he won two bronze medals in the men's doubles event at the FIL World Luge Natural Track Championships (1979, 1982).

Prantl also won a gold medal in the men's double event at the 1979 FIL European Luge Natural Track Championships in Aosta, Italy.

References
Natural track European Championships results 1970-2006.
Natural track World Championships results: 1979-2007

Austrian male lugers
Living people
Year of birth missing (living people)